Khash city (Persian/Pashto: خاش), also called Ghurghuri (Pashto/Balochi: غورغوري) is a town and capital of Khash Rod District of Nimruz Province, Afghanistan.

Climate
Khash has a hot desert climate (Köppen BWh), characterised by little precipitation and high variation between summer and winter temperatures. The average temperature in Khash is 21.4 °C, while the annual precipitation averages 62 mm. July is the hottest month of the year with an average temperature of 34.4 °C. The coldest month January has an average temperature of 8.0 °C.

References

Populated places in Nimruz Province